Buckaroo Sheriff of Texas is a 1951 American Western film directed by Philip Ford and starring Michael Chapin, Eilene Janssen, and James Bell.

The film's sets were designed by art director Frank Arrigo.

Plot

Cast
 Michael Chapin as Red White  
 Eilene Janssen as Judy Dawson  
 James Bell as Sheriff Tom White  
 Hugh O'Brian as Ted Gately  
 Steve Pendleton as Sam White  
 Tristram Coffin as Jim Tulane  
 William Haade as Henchman Mark Brannigan  
 Alice Kelley as Betty Dawson  
 Selmer Jackson as Governor  
 Ed Cassidy as Clint  
 George Taylor as Governor's Secretary  
 Steve Dunhill as Wagon Guard  
 Billy Dix as Wagon Driver  
 Eddie Dunn as Stage Driver 
 Tommy Coats as Henchman  
 Chick Hannan as Henchman  
 Silver Harr as Henchman  
 Cactus Mack as Henchman Mike  
 Bob Reeves as Rancher

References

Bibliography
 Pitts, Michael R. Western Movies: A Guide to 5,105 Feature Films. McFarland, 2012.

External links
 

1951 films
1951 Western (genre) films
1950s English-language films
American Western (genre) films
Films directed by Philip Ford
Republic Pictures films
American black-and-white films
1950s American films